Marcelo José da Silva (born 25 May 1976) is a former Brazilian footballer.

Biography
In July 2002, he left for Spartak Moscow. He played 3 times for Spartak at 2002–03 UEFA Champions League, all at group stage and as substitute. In January 2003, he left for Bahia on loan.

In summer 2004, he trailed at Italian Serie B side Perugia but the club could not sign non-EU footballers from abroad, which Silva's EU nationality had to wait for 4 months, made the deal collapsed and the Italian club went bankrupt in summer 2005.

In February 2005, he returned to Brazil for Goiás, signed a 1-year contract. He then left for Atlético Paranaense in May 2006.

On 1 September 2007, he left for Náutico, signed a contract until the end of 2007 Campeonato Brasileiro. On 1 January 2008, he signed a 1-year contract with Vitória but on 1 September 2008 left for Bragantino.

In June 2009, Silva returned to Juventus for São Paulo State Cup. He then retired from football.

References

Honours
Campeonato Brasileiro Série C: 1997
Copa CONMEBOL: 1998
Russian Cup: 2002–03

External links
 CBF Contract Record 
 
 
 
 furacao.com 
 

Brazilian footballers
Brazilian expatriate footballers
Clube Atlético Juventus players
Santos FC players
FC Spartak Moscow players
Russian Premier League players
Esporte Clube Bahia players
Clube Atlético Mineiro players
Goiás Esporte Clube players
Club Athletico Paranaense players
Clube Náutico Capibaribe players
Esporte Clube Vitória players
Association football midfielders
Expatriate footballers in Russia
Footballers from São Paulo
1976 births
Living people